Vieux-Habitants (French for Old Inhabitants) is a commune on Guadeloupe, a French overseas department in the Caribbean. It is located on the southwest coast of the island of Basse-Terre.

History
This is the oldest parish, founded in 1636, when the first French settlers inhabited the west coast near the present site of Vieux Habitants. The name, meaning "Old Settlers" derives from the fact that many employees of the West Indies Company retired here and preferred to be called "inhabitants" to distinguish between themselves and the slaves. It grew gradually as an agricultural area, famous for its coffee, vanilla and Creole gardens.

Geography
Vieux-Habitants is located in the southwest of Basse-Terre island, 87 kilometres southwest of Pointe à Pitre. It is bordered by the commune of Baillif to the south and Bouillante to the north. The commune also contains the village of Marigot to the north, between Vieux-Habitants village and Bouilliante. The Grand-Rivières river and forests forms a major part of the local scenery, flowing through the Domaniale forest of Guadeloupe National Park into the sea. Natural landmarks include the Plage de Rocroy beach, the Beaugendre Valley of the Grand-Rivières and L'Etang. There are numerous fresh water pools in the commune.

Population

Landmarks
Notable plantations in the commune include the Domaine de Vanibel, Domaine de Grivelière, and the Le Musée du Café. Eglise Franc-Maçonne was built in the 18th century.

Sport
It is the home of football club JS Vieux-Habitants, who are the reigning champions of the Guadeloupe Division d'Honneur.

Education
Public preschools:
 Ecole maternelle Bourg Vieux-habitants
 Ecole maternelle Géry
 Ecole maternelle Beaujean-Labique Gratienne
 Ecole maternelle Duloir Henriette

Public primary schools:
 Ecole primaire La Cousinière
 Ecole primaire Géry
 Ecole primaire Marigot
 Ecole primaire Bourg Vieux-Habitants

Public junior high schools include:
 Collège Suze Angely

Notable people
Victorin Lurel, President of the Regional Council of Guadeloupe

See also
Communes of the Guadeloupe department

References

Communes of Guadeloupe
Populated places established in 1636
1636 establishments in the French colonial empire